Sør-Spitsbergen National Park encompasses the southern end of Spitsbergen island in the Svalbard archipelago, Norway. The park was opened in  1973 and includes Wedel Jarlsberg Land, Torell Land and Sørkapp Land. Over 65% of the region is ice cap, with much of the rest tundra.

Important Bird Area
The park contains bird sanctuaries which protect islands with grassy vegetation, freshwater ponds and areas of bare rock. One of these is the Isøyane Bird Sanctuary which has also recognised as a wetland of international importance by designation under the Ramsar Convention. The park has been identified as an Important Bird Area (IBA) by BirdLife International because it supports breeding populations of barnacle geese (850–950 pairs), common eiders (1000 pairs), black-legged kittiwakes (25,900 pairs) and thick-billed guillemots (over 200,000 pairs).

References

  Norwegian Directorate for Nature Management on Sør-Spitsbergen National Park

National parks of Svalbard
Protected areas established in 1973
1973 establishments in Norway
Ramsar sites in Norway
Important Bird Areas of Svalbard
Seabird colonies
Spitsbergen